Hylonomoipos is a genus of velvet worms in the family Peripatopsidae. All species in this genus have 15 pairs of legs in both sexes. They are found in southeastern Queensland, Australia.

Species
The genus contains the following species:

 Hylonomoipos akares Reid, 1996
 Hylonomoipos brookensis Reid, 1996

References

Further reading 
 

Onychophorans of Australasia
Onychophoran genera
Taxa named by Amanda Reid (malacologist)